Lance Keith Landrum (born c. 1970) is an active duty United States Air Force lieutenant general who serves as the 23rd Deputy Chair of the NATO Military Committee since October 11, 2021. He most recently served as a special assistant to the commander of the United States European Command and prior to that served as the Director of Operations (J3) for United States European Command from July 2020 to July 2021. 

Landrum earned his commission in May 1992 from the United States Air Force Academy. He has held a variety of positions in F-16 fighter operations at the squadron, group and wing levels. He is a graduate of the United States Air Force Weapons School, commanded the 510th Fighter Squadron, Aviano Air Base, Italy, and the 332nd Expeditionary Operations Group, Joint Base Balad, Iraq. Landrum also commanded the 388th Fighter Wing, Hill Air Force Base, Utah and the 31st Fighter Wing, Aviano AB, Italy. His duties have included assignments to the Pentagon as the Aide de Camp to the Chief of Staff of the Air Force, the Director of the U.S. Air Force Colonels Management Office, and Joint Staff J8 Deputy Director for Requirements and Capability Development.

Landrum is a command pilot with more than 2,800 flying hours, including 395 combat hours.

Education
1992 Bachelor of Science, Engineering Mechanics, U.S. Air Force Academy, Colorado Springs, Colo.
2001 Masters in Aeronautical Science, Management, Embry-Riddle Aeronautical University, Daytona Beach, Fla.
2001 Squadron Officer School, Maxwell Air Force Base, Ala.
2003 Air Command and Staff College, Maxwell AFB, Ala., by correspondence
2010 Master of Science, Strategic Studies, Air War College, Maxwell AFB, Ala.
2015 Leadership Decision Making Program, Harvard Kennedy School, Harvard University
2018 Global/Regional Course – Africa, Alan L. Freed Associates, Washington, D.C.
2018 Combined Forces Air Component Commander's Course, Maxwell AFB, Ala.
2019 Enterprise Leadership Program, Kenan-Flagler Business School, University of North Carolina at Chapel Hill
2019 US-UK 1-Star Rising Leaders Forum

Military assignments
1. August 1992 – September 1993, Student, Undergraduate Pilot Training, Vance Air Force Base, Okla. 
2. October 1993 – December 1993, Student, Fighter Lead-in Training, 49th Flying Training Squadron, Columbus AFB, Miss. 
3. January 1994 – December 1994, F-16 Student, Replacement Training Unit, 61st Fighter Squadron, Luke AFB, Ariz. 
4. December 1994 – December 1995, F-16 Pilot, Assistant Weapons Officer, Scheduler, 36th Fighter Squadron, Osan Air Base, South Korea 
5. January 1996 – August 1998, F-16 Instructor Pilot, Assistant Weapons Officer, Scheduler, 4th Fighter Squadron, Hill AFB, Utah 
6. January 1999 – June 1999, F-16 Student, U.S. Air Force Weapons School, Nellis AFB, Nev. 
7. June 1999 – March 2002, F-16 Instructor Pilot, Chief of Weapons, 310th Fighter Squadron, Luke AFB, Ariz. 
8. March 2002 – June 2003, F-16 Instructor Pilot, Flight Commander, U.S. Air Force Weapons School, Nellis AFB, Nev. 
9. July 2003 – September 2005, Aide to the Chief of Staff, Headquarters U.S. Air Force, the Pentagon, Arlington, Va. 
10. November 2005 – June 2009, 31st Fighter Wing Chief of Plans, 555th Fighter Squadron Operations Officer, 510th Fighter Squadron Commander, Aviano AB, Italy 
11. July 2009 – May 2010, Student, Air War College, Maxwell AFB, Ala. 
12. June 2010 – June 2011, Commander, 332nd Expeditionary Operations Group, Joint Base Balad, Iraq 
13. August 2011 – June 2013, Senior Military Advisor, U.S. Mission to NATO 
14. June 2013 – June 2015, Commander, 388th Fighter Wing, Hill AFB, Utah 
15. July 2015 – June 2016, Director of the U.S. Air Force Colonels Management office, Headquarters U.S. Air Force, the Pentagon, Arlington, Va. 
16. June 2016 – June 2018, Commander, 31st Fighter Wing, Aviano AB, Italy 
17. July 2018 – July 2020, Deputy Director for Requirements and Capability Development (J8), the Joint Staff, Arlington, Va. 
18. July 2020–July 2021, Director of Operations (J3), U.S. European Command, Stuttgart, Germany.
19. July 2021–October 2021, Special Assistant to the Commander, U.S. European Command, Stuttgart, Germany.
20. October 2021–present, Deputy Chair, NATO Military Committee, Brussels, Belgium

Effective dates of promotion

References

Living people
United States Air Force Academy alumni
Embry–Riddle Aeronautical University
Air War College alumni
Recipients of the Legion of Merit
United States Air Force generals
Year of birth missing (living people)